The M-6 motorway, or the Sukkur–Hyderabad motorway, is an under-construction motorway project in Pakistan. It will connect Sukkur to Hyderabad. The 306 km long M-6 motorway is the only missing vital link of North to South connectivity, i.e. from Karachi to Peshawar. The motorway will cost approximately $1.7 billion to build. The M-6 will be a six-lane motorway with a design speed of 120 km/hour, 89 bridges, 15 interchanges and 243 underpasses.

The project is to be built as part of the larger Eastern Alignment of the China–Pakistan Economic Corridor (CPEC).

Planned time to complete this 296 km long motorway is 29 months. China State Construction Engineering won the project after bidding process in May 2017, while the ground work was anticipated to start by August 2017 and finish by December 2019. However, the project faced delays which meant that work could not start for several years.

On 13 December 2022, Prime Minister Shehbaz Sharif formally laid the foundation stone of the project. It is planned to be completed in 30 months.

History 
All the other segments of 1650 km Peshawar–Karachi Motorway(PKM) have been completed except Hyderabad–Sukkur Motorway section of PKM. 63% land acquisition has been completed. Planned time to complete this 306 km long motorway project is 28 months.

On 16 July 2020, in an economic committee meeting presided over by PM Imran Khan's advisor on Finance and Revenue Dr. Abdul Hafeez Shaikh gave a go-ahead to the construction of the 306-kilometre-long Hyderabad–Sukkur Motor-way at a cost of Rs165.67bn
.

China State Construction Engineering won the project after bidding process in May 2017 with anticipated ground work to be started by August 2017 and finish the same by December 2019. The construction contract was awarded in July 2017 however, construction is not started yet due to pending Government and NHA decision.

As of April, 2021, the Central Development Working Party (CDWP) recommended the Rs 191.47 bn, 306 km Hyderabad–Sukkur Motorway project to the Executive Committee of the National Economic Council (Ecnec).

The construction of Hyderabad–Sukkur Motorway (M-6) will be done under public-private financing mode on the Build-Operate-Transfer (BOT) basis.

Route
At its southern terminus, the M-6 motorway will connect to the M-9 motorway at Jamshoro for onward connections to Karachi. The route will then course towards the northeast, and connect to the N-55 Indus Highway via an interchange. It will continue to course towards the northeast to connect to the city of Hyderabad, via an intersection with the N-5 National Highway. From there, the road will course towards the north towards the cities of Matiari, Tando Adam, Shahdadpur, and Nawabshah in central Sindh. It will then continue northwards towards Khairpur, and finally course northeast again towards the city of Rohri, which lies across the Indus River from Sukkur in northern Sindh province. From Rohri, a controlled-access motorway will continue onwards towards Multan and Islamabad.

Financing
Construction of the motorway is to cost an estimated $1.7 billion. While the government of China has extended low interest concessionary loans to cover large portions of CPEC infrastructure projects, the government of Pakistan in July 2016 decided to allow international bidding for the project, citing difficulty meeting Pakistan's required financial contributions for utilization of concessionary Chinese loans. Chinese and South Korean companies have reportedly shown early interest in the project.

As of April, 2021, the Central Development Working Party (CDWP) recommended the Rs 191.47 bn, 306 km Hyderabad–Sukkur Motorway project to the Executive Committee of the National Economic Council (Ecnec).

The construction of Hyderabad–Sukkur Motorway (M-6) will be done under public-private financing mode on the Build-Operate-Transfer (BOT) basis.

Construction 
As of April, 2021 The federal government  deferred approval of Rs192 billion worth of Hyderabad–Sukkur motorway project due to proposed changes in its financing model, which now seeks Rs76 billion from the budget compared to the original plan of constructing the road with private sector funding.

The Central Development Working Party (CDWP), which has a mandate to approve public sector projects, referred back the scheme to the Public Private Partnership (PPP) Authority for vetting the budget demand of Rs76 billion.

As of April, 2021, the Central Development Working Party (CDWP) recommended the Rs 191.47 billion, 306 km Hyderabad–Sukkur Motorway project to the Executive Committee of the National Economic Council (Ecnec). The project would be included in the 2021 federal budget. It is to be implemented on the BOT user-charge basis with the provision of significantly higher financial contribution by the federal government through a capital and operational viability gap fund (VGF) to improve the financial viability of the project. The project is expected to be completed in 30 months

The construction of Hyderabad–Sukkur Motorway (M-6) will be done under public-private financing mode on the Build-Operate-Transfer (BOT) basis. The Executive Committee of the National Economic Council (Ecnec) on 26 May 2021 approved 10 development projects, including the Hyderabad–Sukkur Motorway.

National Highway Authority (NHA) on Friday (February 4, 2022) issued a final evaluation report regarding the proposals submitted by interested bidders and declared Techno-consortium as the most advantageous bidder.

The groundbreaking ceremony of the project was held on 13 December 2022. The construction work is expected to take 30 months.

Land Scam 
During the land acquisition phase of the project in June 2022, Deputy Commissioner (DC) of Naushahro Feroz, Tashfeen Alam Khan, DC of Matiari, Adnan Rasheed, and Assistant Commissioner of Matiari, Mansoor Abbasi, embezzled funds deposited for the process. The three civil servants withdrew Rs. 2.3 billion from the Sindh Bank account in which National Highway Authority had deposited the funds by using cheques in their names. Abbasi and Rasheed were arrested on 18 November 2022, while Alam fled to Azerbaijan the same day. Sindh government is seeking an Interpol red warrant for his arrest and extradition. Three Sindh Bank officials, including Area Manager, Tabish Shah, have also been arrested by Federal Investigation Agency in the case.  Of the amount withdrawn, only Rs. 556 million was actually disbursed to landowners with Rs. 446 million recovered from Rasheed, which leaves Rs. 1.32 billion still unaccounted for.

Interchanges

References

External links
 National Highway Authority
 Pakistan National Highways & Motorway Police

M06
Proposed roads in Pakistan